"Twistin' the Night Away" is a song written and recorded by Sam Cooke. It was recorded on 18 December 1961 and released as a single in 1962. It became very popular, charting in the top ten of both the Billboard Hot 100 (#9) and Billboard's R&B chart (#1).  "Twistin' the Night Away" was successful overseas as well, peaking at #6 on the UK Singles Chart.

The song was recorded with The Wrecking Crew as session musicians, including Rene Hall as band leader, Red Callender on bass, Earl Palmer on drums, Tommy Tedesco and Clifton White on guitars, Ed Beal on piano, John Kelson, John Ewing and Jewell Grant on saxophone and Stuart Williamson on trumpet.

Personnel
Sam Cooke – vocals
René Hall – guitar, arrangement, conducting
Clifton White, Tommy Tedesco – guitar
Red Callender – bass guitar
Earl Palmer – drums
Eddie Beal – piano
Stuart Williamson – trumpet
John Ewing – trombone
Jewell Grant – baritone saxophone

Chart history

Weekly charts

Year-end charts

Rod Stewart version

In 1973, Rod Stewart released his version as the third single from Never a Dull Moment, his fourth album. This version achieved marginal success, peaking at #59 on the Billboard Hot 100. In 1987, he re-recorded the song for the soundtrack to the film Innerspace. When released as a single in the summer of 1987, this version hit #80 on the Hot 100.

Track listing
 "Twistin' The Night Away" - 3:15
 "True Blue" - 3:29

1987 Re-recorded version (from the film, Innerspace)
 "Twistin' The Night Away" — Rod Stewart (4:10)
 "Let's Get Small" — Jerry Goldsmith (5:57)

Charts
Original release

Reissue

Divine version

Divine recorded "Twistin' The Night Away" and released it as the second single from his album Maid in England in 1985.

Track listing
 "Twistin' The Night Away (Dance Version)" — 6:53
 "Twistin' The Night Away (Instrumental)" — 6:10
 "A Divine Good Time" — 3:52

Charts

Other cover versions
 The song was also covered by the Motown group, the Marvelettes. Their version of the song appeared on the 1962 album, The Marvelettes Sing Smash Hits of 1962.
 The Glitter Band covered the song in 1974, on their debut album "Hey!".
 The song was recorded by Hutti Heita as a dark psytrance track in 2009.

Elsewhere in popular culture 
 Cooke's version also appeared in the 1978 classic Animal House, the 1987 film Innerspace, and the 2011 film The Green Hornet.
 The Shins titled their third album Wincing the Night Away in an apparent reference to the song.
 The song appeared in a dance sequence  in Umbrella Academy

See also
Twist songs
List of number-one R&B singles of 1962 (U.S.)

References

Sam Cooke songs
Rod Stewart songs
Divine (performer) songs
1962 singles
1973 singles
1985 singles
1987 singles
Songs written by Sam Cooke
1961 songs
Mercury Records singles
RCA Victor singles
Song recordings produced by Hugo & Luigi
Twist (dance)
Songs about dancing